The Plains Vintage Railway & Historical Museum is a heritage railway and recreated historic village in the Tinwald Domain, Tinwald, New Zealand. The railway (operating as The Plains Railway) runs on approximately three kilometres of rural railway line that was once part of the Mount Somers Branch. The village and railway are open regularly to the public. The railway utilises preserved and restored locomotives and rolling stock once used on New Zealand's national railway network, while the village shows visitors how life was lived in New Zealand's pioneering past.

Overview 

The Ashburton Railway & Preservation Society Inc. (AR&PS) was founded in 1971 with the goal of purchasing a section of the former Mt Somers Branch railway on which to run restored locomotives alongside preserving heritage farm machinery fast disappearing from the surrounding district. To meet the goal the AR&PS founded The Plains Vintage Railway & Historical Museum and began to acquire exhibits – of both railway, agricultural and other locally historical items – and to erect buildings for storage and display purposes. The museum also acquired three of its most significant buildings, namely the cottage, church and railway station, by relocating existing buildings to the site of The Plains Vintage Railway & Historical Museum.

K 88 Trust Board 

The K 88 Trust Board was formed on 23 May 1995 and ceased to exist on 3 November 2015. Their overarching goal was to restore and overhaul K's 88 and, perhaps, 94 to operating condition. It was a legal charitable trust along with The Friends of K 88 (a parallel support group).

The plan was to:
 Lease K's 88 and 94 from the Ashburton Railway & Preservation Society
 Construct a shed as a base and where 88 will be restored
 Restore K 88 to working order
 Raise funds needed
 Promote the research and recordings in Mid-Canterbury.

On 10 April 1996 The locomotives were formally leased to the K 88 Trust from the Ashburton Railway & Preservation Society, the K 88 Trust Board had purchased the former Ashburton Countdown Supermarket in January 1996 for the restoration base for the locomotives and the trust as a whole.

Fundraising was well under-way before September 1996 and the first goal of restoring K 88 was achieved in 1997 with the construction of its new tender tank well under-way.

After being in storage for many years at The Plains Railway with a condemned boiler, K88 was leased to the Trust Board  for restoration to working order. This restoration included a new boiler and tender tank. The 1903 belpaire boiler condemned on 24 September 1987 due to thinness in the firebox. The original tender tank was badly rusted out. Restoration commenced in 1997 with the new tender tank being built at Helmack Engineering in Ashburton. The tender tank was copied from its original tank. The building of the newly welded belpaire boiler was planned from the 1903 boiler. Funds were made for $100.000. The new boiler was built by Lyttelton Engineering Limited and cost $151.000. In December 1998 K 95's tender frame and bogies were recovered from the Branxholme locomotive dump in the Ōreti River. K 88's original tender frame was badly bent and the bogies were ex-NZR wagon bogies. The building of the new boiler took a year and four months to complete. The boiler was fitted to the frame of K 88 on 1 July 2000 and the tender tank was fitted to the tender frame not long after. A new funnel was made by a local engineer. It was first steamed on 14 November in the same year. K 88 was recommissioned on 30 March 2002 where it showed off her new kaleidoscope that she had worn when she arrived in February 1878. Today K 88 is in active service at The Plains Railway and still is notable for hauling the first inter city express in New Zealand between Christchurch and Dunedin, being one of the original Kingston Flyer locomotives, the first ever locomotive in the world to be restored from a river bed and the oldest ex-NZR tender locomotive in New Zealand.

Restoration of K 94
K 94's never re-commenced (even though its restoration commenced in April 1986 but was put off). Most parts that were in good order were used to replace parts in poor order on K 88. K 94 today sits behind the carriage shed at The Plains Vintage Railway & Historical Museum and is can be used for comparison purposes when compared with K 88 as it was recovered on 19 January 1974.

2015 Arson Attack 
On the morning of 17 January 2015, the old workshop building burnt down after an arsonist set light to it. The fire destroyed most things contained within the shed (mainly tools, parts, nuts and bolts, boxes, potato equipment, etc.) with only few very of the contents able to be recovered. The fire was reported at around 5:00am that morning. Five fire engines and a water tanker attended the blaze to bring it under control. The fire was labelled suspicious and a Police investigation is ongoing. The locomotive shed alongside the workshop was damaged, but has been made safe with minor repairs to secure the building.

Locomotives, Railcars and Rolling Stock 

The Plains Railway came to world attention when a member of the Rogers K class, K 88, was recovered on 19 January 1974 from the Branxholme Locomotive Dump in the Ōreti River in Southland. Transported by truck to The Plains Railway in July 1974 and restored to a fully operational condition on 27 November 1982. This has set a pattern other railway enthusiasts recovering a number of locomotives of various classes from where they were dumped including two other K's. One of them being K 94 was recovered by a private owner and transported by truck to The Plains Railway. Restoration commenced in April 1986 but was later cancelled. It is presently in storage in an unrestored condition and is used as a comparison as it vividly illustrates the condition in which K 88 was recovered and the work required to bring the locomotive to running condition. K 88 received a second restoration beginning in 1997 by the K 88 Trust Board. It was completed on 30 March 2002. The second restoration saw her receive a brand new Belpaire Boiler and tender tank.

The museum's rail rolling stock contains several historically important items. These are A 64 which is currently the second oldest operating steam locomotive in New Zealand; JA 1260 which was the last steam locomotive to haul the last night train out of Invercargill and the last steam locomotive to haul trains out of Christchurch; K 88 Washington – which hauled the first inter city express in New Zealand between Christchurch and Dunedin, being one of the original Kingston Flyer locomotives, the first ever locomotive in the world to be restored from a river bed and the oldest ex-NZR tender locomotive in New Zealand; Vulcan Railcar RM 50 which holds the official New Zealand Railways speed record of 78 mph and TR 38 which is the first petrol locomotive in New Zealand.

In addition:
 B 10 from the Oamaru Steam and Rail Restoration Society for the NZ Rail 150 celebrations in October 2013. It also hosted a running day at the railway on 3 November in the same year.
 Rail Heritage Trust of New Zealand's F 163 "Ivanhoe" visited the railway in February 1979 for display in a festival, the locomotive did not run on the Railway.
 K 92 from The Waimea Plains Railway Trust came to the railway in early 2004 where it regularly operated on their open days, including on several occasions with K 88 until 2007, when it was transferred to Oamaru Steam and Rail
 Another RHTNZ locomotive, W 192 visited the railway on a number of occasions from 1992 to 2001.
 F 150, of the Ocean Beach Railway, was stored in a dismantled condition at The Plains Railway from 1986 until 2019 when it was transferred to Invercargill for restoration.

NZR Steam locomotives

NZR Diesel locomotives

Industrial Diesel locomotives

Railcars 

In addition:
 Spare power bogies and engines for the railcar are currently in outside storage.

Carriages 

In addition:
 A 222 Formerly owned by the Tranz Rails heritage fleet. In 2002 it was leased to the society. It was later donated to the Canterbury Railway Society.

Guards and Brake vans

Wagons

Cranes

Jiggers 

The society has in their care 3 four-wheel motor jiggers, a three-wheel motor jigger, 2 four-wheel hand jiggers and a three-wheel hand jigger. They also have four trailers also in their care.

Traction Engines 
The society has three tractions engines and one portable engine in their collection.
The traction engines consist of a 1/3 scale Burrell Traction Engine built by a local engineer the late Hughey Rainey, a McLaren NO. 1718 (owned by the Ashburton District Council) and a Marshall NO. 59534. In the past some AR&PS members have loaned their engines to the museum for extended periods, but these have since gone elsewhere.

The Society has a Portable Engine of Marshall, Sons & Co. in their collection, which is currently privately owned.

Traction Engines

Portables 

Also:
 The AR&PS also have a boiler from a Garrett Portable Traction Engine in their care.

Machinery

Binders

Gallery

References 

 New Zealand Rolling Stock Register
 NZR Rolling Stock Lists
 NZR Locomotives
 White Bus Family Productions

Further reading

External links 
 Official website of The Plains Vintage Railway & Historical Museum

Rail transport in Canterbury, New Zealand
Rail transport preservation in New Zealand
Heritage railways in New Zealand
Museums in Canterbury, New Zealand
Railway museums in New Zealand
Ashburton, New Zealand
1971 establishments in New Zealand